Jim Butterworth was appointed Director of the Georgia Emergency Management Agency by Governor Nathan Deal in January 2015. Previously, Butterworth served as the adjutant general (TAG) of the Georgia National Guard.

Early life and education
Butterworth is a graduate of the University of Georgia, where he earned a Bachelor of Science degree in political science, and was active in Air Force ROTC. He was named "AFROTC Cadet of the Year" two of his four years at Georgia.

Early career
Butterworth was appointed by Governor Deal to adjutant general and promoted to the state rank of major general.  Prior to his appointment, the highest rank he attained was captain. He was never recognized by the U.S. Air Force as a general officer nor rank above major though he continued to refer to himself as a Major General.  During his time as adjutant general, Butterworth had numerous complaints filed against him. One complaint was substantiated for improperly using Blackhawk helicopters to deliver a game ball to his former high school. Butterworth was forced to reimburse the government for the use of the helicopter. In April 2015, the State of Georgia settled a whistleblower lawsuit filed against him for ethical misconduct. The plaintiff was awarded $480,000.

Political career
Butterworth previously served as the chairman of the Habersham County, Georgia

References

Republican Party Georgia (U.S. state) state senators
National Guard (United States) officers
Year of birth missing (living people)
Living people
People from Habersham County, Georgia
University of Georgia alumni
21st-century American politicians